The 1922 United States Senate election in Connecticut was held on November 7, 1922. Incumbent Republican Senator George P. McLean was re-elected to a third term in office over Democratic attorney Thomas J. Spellacy.

General election

Candidates
George E. Carey (Independent)
George P. McLean, incumbent Senator since 1911 (Republican)
Isadore Polsky (Socialist and Farmer-Labor)
Thomas J. Spellacy, Wall Street attorney and former State Senator from Hartford (Democratic)

Results

References

Connecticut
1922
1922 Connecticut elections